Viske Hundred was a hundred in Halland, Sweden.

It was composed of Stråvalla, Sällstorp, Veddige, Värö and Ås parishes, all currently in Varberg Municipality

References

Hundreds of Halland